Dominic Harris (born 16 November 1976) is a British artist known for integrating modern technology and classical design in his interactive artworks.

Background 
Dominic Harris was born in London on 16 November 1976, and grew up in London, Brussels, and Michigan before returning to London in 1995.  Harris attended the Cranbrook Kingswood Upper School, and then trained as an architect at the Bartlett School of Architecture, and has been ARB registered since 2011.

Harris designs and fabricates his artworks at Dominic Harris Studio, a multi-disciplinary practice he founded in 2007. This studio consists of 30 people with diverse backgrounds including architecture, product design, electronics, programming, graphic design, and workshop skills.

Harris uses the resources of his studio for the ongoing development, prototyping and production of his artworks. Harris also oversees the studio's international projects where his fascinations are translated into larger scale projects that span residential, retail, and public art projects.  In 2015, Harris was granted permission by the Walt Disney Company to use their Intellectual Property for the purpose of making new interactive artworks. Harris is the only artist to gain permission to use Disney's back catalogue of characters, and led him to creating his interactive versions of "Snow White and the Seven Dwarfs" and "Mickey and Minnie: An Interactive Diptych".

Harris is also the founding partner of a sister studio in London called Cinimod Studio that creates large commissioned installations, interactive events and lighting designs for large brands.

Works

Exhibitions 
The works of Dominic Harris have been exhibited internationally, both through direct representation and gallery representation.

Solo shows:

 "US: NOW" at Halcyon Gallery, Mayfair, London, UK - 2020
 "Imagine" at Halcyon Gallery, Mayfair, London, UK - 2019
"5 Year Celebration", Priveekollektie Contemporary Art | Design, London, UK - 2016.
"Moments of Reflection" at PHOS ART + DESIGN, Mayfair, London, UK - 2015

Recent exhibitions include:
 Victoria & Albert Museum
 Dublin Science Museum
 Design Miami / Basel
 Design Miami
 Art Miami
 Art 14, London
 PAD Paris
 PAD London
 Art Geneva

Gallery Representation 

 2010 to 2019:  Dominic Harris was represented by Priveekollektie Contemporary Art | Design, a Dutch gallery based in Heusden, the Netherlands, and with a regular presence on the international art and design circuits.  
 2015: Dominic Harris was shown with PHOS ART + DESIGN Gallery, in Mayfair, London, UK.
 2019 - ongoing:  Dominic Harris is exclusively represented by the Halcyon Gallery, an established international gallery based in Mayfair, London.

Collections 
The majority of Harris's work has been bought by private collectors.  Since 2012 Harris's work is also being acquired by several large institutional collections, including the Borusan Contemporary Art Collection in Istanbul.  Harris's artworks include some of the biggest and most respected international art collectors and are also displayed in public spaces.

Books 
 A Touch Of Code. Documents the "Beacon" art installation and "Flutter" artwork
 Dominic Harris, Artworks, Edition Eight. 
Digital Real: Kunst & Nachhaltigkeit Vol 8.

Interviews 
 Video interview of Dominic Harris for The New York Times
 Video interview of Dominic Harris for Kyoorius
 Interview with Dominic Harris for Total Lighting Magazine
"Dominic Harris: Imagine" Video interview and exhibition introduction for Halcyon exhibition 2019.

References

External links 
 Authorized Dominic Harris Website
 Cinimod Studio, the production studio of Dominic Harris

1976 births
Living people